Jaan Ehlvest (born 14 October 1962) is an Estonian-American chess player. He was awarded the title Grandmaster by FIDE in 1987. Ehlvest was Estonian champion in 1986. Since 2006, he has represented the United States.

He was named Estonian Athlete of the Year in 1987 and 1989. From July 1990 to July 1991, he was among the top 10 on the FIDE world rankings, peaking at number 5 in the list of January 1991.

Career
Ehlvest's tournament victories include the 1980 USSR Junior Chess Championship, the 1983 European Junior Championship, the 1986 Estonian Championship, the 1994 New York Open, and the 2003 World Open in Philadelphia, Pennsylvania. When SK Rockaden won the 2001 Swedish championship they fielded Ehlvest.

He was a member of the gold medal-winning Soviet Union team at the 28th Chess Olympiad in Thessaloniki 1988 and played for Estonia in the Chess Olympiads of 1992–2004.

In 2006, unsatisfied with the lack of support from the Estonian Chess Federation, Ehlvest decided to move to the United States; since then, he has been a member of the USCF and competed internationally for the US.

In March 2007, Ehlvest accepted an invitation to play an eight-game match against the chess program Rybka, one of the strongest chess programs in existence. He was playing Black in all games, but was given pawn odds (Rybka was playing each game a pawn down; a different white pawn was removed in each game). He lost the match by 2½:5½ (+1−4=3). In a following rematch, the pawn odds were removed, Ehlvest was given White in every game, twice the time on the clock, and significant computational handicaps were placed on the machine. Ehlvest lost decisively, 1½:4½.

In 2008 he won the Pan American-Continental Championship, which took place in Boca Raton, Florida.

Personal life
Ehlvest's younger brother, Jüri Ehlvest, was a well-known writer in Estonia.

Ehlvest studied psychology at Tartu State University (now, University of Tartu). In 2004, Ehlvest published his autobiography, The Story of a Chess Player.

References

Further reading

External links 

1962 births
Living people
Chess grandmasters
Chess Olympiad competitors
Estonian chess players
Soviet chess players
Estonian emigrants to the United States
American chess players
University of Tartu alumni
Sportspeople from Tallinn